A shuttle bus is a bus that travels a shorter route in comparison to most bus routes. Typically, shuttle buses travel in both directions between two points. Shuttle buses are designed to transport large groups of people who are all travelling to and from a specific destination in a more organized manner. Shuttle buses can be used on several occasions, such as transporting university students or used as a method to transport people from airports to hotels.

Types of shuttle buses

Airport bus

Airport buses, airport shuttles, and airport shuttle buses are buses that travel between the airport and a city centre. These buses mainly travel to major transit hubs, however, may also travel directly to major hotels around the city. Buses that travel directly to the city are sometimes referred to as hotel shuttles.

University shuttles
University shuttles are buses that travel between the campus area and may sometimes serve major transport hubs and railway stations. University shuttles operate within larger campuses that may not allow public road access. These shuttles cut down transportation times between two ends of the campus and allow students to travel safely during the night through dark places. University shuttles also tend to operate out of regular operational hours for regular bus services.

Rail replacement buses

Rail replacement buses are buses that operate when a particular train line is down. These services are usually run public bus services, in some cases, may also hire additional buses and for long-distance services will use regional coaches. These services tend to gain negative reception, as they lack many of the benefits that trains have over buses.

Employee shuttles
Employee shuttles are buses used to transport employees between their homes and workplaces, these shuttles also may be used to transport people within workplaces. These employee shuttles provide benefits such as easing daily commuters of workers. Many employers are also using employee shuttle buses as an alternative to personal cars to reduce emissions produced by the company and their employees.

Community transport

Community transport (British English) or paratransit (North American English) are shuttle buses designed to transport those with disabilities and other people who are struggling to get around. Community transit is often designed to be accessible for those in wheelchairs by offering additional features that may not always be present on regular buses. These extra features include special equipment, ramps and additional wheelchair areas.

Shuttle buses and COVID-19

Due to the COVID-19 pandemic and the Russo-Ukrainian War during 2020 and 2022, the demand for air travel and airport buses had declined. Despite this, the demand for airport buses is projected to increase in the next 5 years due to the predicted rise of air travel and demand for cleaner forms of transport. During the end of COVID-19, many people were accustomed to working at home, as a result many companies began to use employee shuttles as a tool to bring people back into the workspace.

Shuttle buses around the world

Australia
In Australia, shuttle buses are used to transport students from transport hubs (such as train stations or bus stations) to their respective universities. In Melbourne several of these operate, the most used of these being 601 which transports students from Huntingdale station to Monash University, Clayton campus. In Brisbane, the most popular shuttle is route 134 that transports students from Queen Street bus station via Griffith University Mount Gravatt campus to Griffith University Nathan campus. Typically, these university shuttles are express and will only serve education precincts or major stops along the route. These buses also tend to have a special livery signifying what university they serve. Shuttle buses in Australia may also be used to connect airports and their respective city centres, an example of this is Melbourne's Skybus which connects Melbourne Airport to Southern Cross Station in Melbourne's CBD. The Kinetic subsidiary also operates airport shuttles in several cities across Australia, such as Hobart.

France

In France, shuttle buses are used commonly used to connect airports and their respective city centres, the most used of these the Roissy bus service from Charles de Gaulle Airport and central Paris. Paris' Roissy bus operates from terminal 2 at Charles de Gaulle Airport to Opéra Station on the Paris Métro.

United Kingdom
In the UK shuttle buses operate at airports as well as connecting universities to local areas. One example of this is the Hotel Hoppa service that travels from Heathrow Airport to several nearby hotels. In the UK, there are also many shuttle buses that serve and their nearby area campuses. For example, Oxford Bus Company operates the science transit shuttle, a shuttle between the University of Oxford and across the surrounding town area.

United States
In the US shuttle buses are used to transport users from airports and city centres. One of the most used of these is the FlyAway bus service connecting Los Angeles and Los Angeles International Airport, this service connects Union Station (Los Angeles) with Los Angeles International airport.

References

Buses by type